The UMTS frequency bands are radio frequencies used by third generation (3G) wireless Universal Mobile Telecommunications System networks. They were allocated by delegates to the World Administrative Radio Conference (WARC-92) held in Málaga-Torremolinos, Spain between 3 February 1992 and 3 March 1992. Resolution 212 (Rev.WRC-97), adopted at the World Radiocommunication Conference held in Geneva, Switzerland in 1997, endorsed the bands specifically for the International Mobile Telecommunications-2000 (IMT-2000) specification by referring to S5.388, which states "The bands 1,885-2,025 MHz and 2,110-2,200 MHz are intended for use, on a worldwide basis, by administrations wishing to implement International Mobile Telecommunications 2000 (IMT-2000). Such use does not preclude the use of these bands by other services to which they are allocated. The bands should be made available for IMT-2000 in accordance with Resolution 212 (Rev. WRC-97)." To accommodate the reality that these initially defined bands were already in use in various regions of the world, the initial allocation has been amended multiple times to include other radio frequency bands.

UMTS-FDD frequency bands and channel bandwidths 
From Tables 5.0 "UTRA FDD frequency bands" of the latest published version of the 3GPP TS 25.101, the following table lists the specified frequency bands of UMTS (FDD):

Deployments by region (UMTS-FDD) 

The following table shows the standardized UMTS bands and their regional use. The main UMTS bands are in bold print.
 Networks on UMTS-bands 1 and 8 are suitable for global roaming in ITU Regions 1, 2 (some countries) and 3.
 Networks on UMTS bands 2 and 4 are suitable for roaming in ITU Region 2 (Americas) only.
 Networks on UMTS band 5 are suitable for roaming in ITU Regions 2 and 3 (single countries).

UMTS-TDD frequency bands and channel bandwidths 
UMTS-TDD technology is standardized for usage in the following bands:

See also 
 3GPP
 List of UMTS networks
 Cellular frequencies
 GSM frequency bands
 LTE frequency bands
 5G NR frequency bands
 CDMA frequency bands
 Mobile network code
 Roaming
 United States 2008 wireless spectrum auction
 White spaces (radio)

References

External links 
 3GPP Specifications for group: R4 - Frequencies info for UMTS (TS 25.101/102/104/105)

Bandplans
Mobile telecommunications
UMTS